Edward Drew Shalka (born March 1, 1995), known professionally as Drew Shalka, is a Canadian singer, multi-instrumentalist, and songwriter. He is the lead vocalist and bassist of the Canadian rock band FKB. He was nominated for a Juno Award for Distant Danger by Nuela Charles.

Early life 
Edward Drew Shalka was born on March 1, 1995, in Bonnyville, Alberta. He joined the band FKB as lead vocalist and bassist while he was in high school in 2009. Growing up he was heavily influenced by the music of The Beatles, The Beach Boys, and Elvis Presley.

Musical career 
Shalka's career in music began with FKB when he met Derek Chalut at school. The band attracted local notoriety and caught the attention of singer-songwriter Clayton Bellamy of the Canadian country band The Road Hammers at a car show in late 2012. Bellamy became interested in their music and co-wrote and produced their first EP 123 FKB.  Following the release in 2014, the band would go on to perform hundreds of shows across Canada and the United States supporting acts including The Trews, Bif Naked, Mother Mother, Dear Rouge, The Road Hammers, Dan Davidson, Pop Evil, and Scott Helman.

In 2017, FKB released the single "Bright Lights" accompanied by a music video and tour of Canada and the United States. They followed this with the single and music video for "My Bedroom" in January 2018 along with another string of Western Canadian tour dates. In July 2018, they released another single with a music video titled "Casual Love" on KnightVision Records.

Shalka co-wrote the single "Danger" released by Canadian singer-songwriter Nuela Charles in 2018. The song reached top 10 on CBC Music and was on Charles' Juno Award nominated album Distant Danger. The single and album won "Pop Recording of the Year" and "Album of the Year" respectively at the Edmonton Music Awards in 2019.

In late 2019, Shalka and the other members of FKB all portrayed themselves and performed their song "My Bedroom" in the film Moments in Spacetime.

Awards and nominations

Discography

Songwriting and performance credits

References

Living people
1995 births
People from the Municipal District of Bonnyville No. 87
Musicians from Alberta
Canadian singer-songwriters
Canadian bass guitarists